Penny Daniels is an American communications consultant and trainer and a former television news anchor who once hosted the TV show A Current Affair.

Early life and education 

Born as Elizabeth Penny Comm, Daniels is a native of Highland Park, Illinois. She earned a Bachelor's degree from the University of Michigan in 1977 and a Master's degree in Broadcast Journalism from Northwestern University in 1980.

Professional career 

Daniels began her career in 1980 at the CBS affiliate in Green Bay Wisconsin, then moved to Buffalo, New York to report and anchor newscasts at WKBW-TV, the ABC affiliate. From there she moved to Washington, D.C., where she was a reporter and fill-in anchor at WJLA-TV, the ABC station from 1985-1988. In the late 1980s and early 1990s, Daniels was an anchor at WSVN-TV in Miami, where she was the first woman to solo anchor a nationally-syndicated, tabloid-style magazine program Inside Story.  The magazine program only ran from 1989-1990, but, according to local ratings, was hugely popular in Miami where it was beating the famous A Current Affair, which was then-anchored by Maury Povich and at the time aired on competing station WCIX-TV (now WFOR-TV). Shortly before leaving WSVN, Daniels was caught on the air telling a producer "You suck!" "I'm sorry I said it," Daniels later said, according to a report in the Chicago Sun-Times on March 22, 1993. "I don't usually lose my temper when I'm doing a newscast."

In April 1993, Daniels joined WBBM-TV in Chicago, Illinois as an anchor and reporter. In mid-1993, Daniels and Joan Lovett began anchoring the station's new noon newscast.

In September 1994, Daniels left WBBM to join A Current Affair as a New York-based weekday host. She hosted the show until September 1995, when she shifted to being a correspondent for the program's weekday editions and the anchor of the show's weekend edition. The show went off the air in 1996.

In 1998, Daniels joined KHQ-TV in Spokane, Washington. In October 2000, Daniels abruptly resigned from KHQ and left the TV news business to work as a communications consultant and trainer in Washington, D.C.

In 2003, Daniels and two partners created the communications consulting and coaching firm, 3D Communications, with offices located across the country. Daniels also interviewed infamous criminal Charles Manson in 1989.

Personal life 

Daniels currently lives in Bethesda, Maryland with her two children. Her former husband, Rick Leventhal, was an on-air reporter for WSVN-TV in Miami and WFLD-TV in Chicago while Daniels was working in those cities. Leventhal now works for Fox News Channel.

References

External links 
 3D Communications Profile

Living people
1954 births
Medill School of Journalism alumni
American television reporters and correspondents
Communications consultants
University of Michigan alumni